The Four Gates Farm, also known as Oak Hill Farm, is a historic home and national historic district located at 13001 Little Blue Rd. in Kansas City, Missouri.  The district encompasses two contributing buildings and four contributing structures. The main house was designed by architect Mary Rockwell Hook in 1925, and is a three-story brick and rubble masonry dwelling. It consists of a rectangular main section with flanking wings and features decks, balconies, projecting one-story porches, and an engaged conical roof over a doorway. Other contributing resources are a small stone farmhouse, a free standing conical roofed stone tower, and three stone outbuildings.

It was listed on the National Register of Historic Places in 1991.

References

Historic districts on the National Register of Historic Places in Missouri
Houses on the National Register of Historic Places in Missouri
Houses completed in 1925
Houses in Kansas City, Missouri
National Register of Historic Places in Kansas City, Missouri